"Do You Love Me?" is a song by Nick Cave and the Bad Seeds appearing on their album Let Love In. It was released as a single on 28 March 1994 by Mute Records.

Accolades

Formats and track listing 
All songs written by Nick Cave, except where noted.
UK 7" single (MUTE 160)
 "Do You Love Me?" (Martyn P. Casey, Nick Cave) – 4:40
 "Cassiels Song" – 3:34
 "Sail Away" – 4:40

German CD single (INT 892.933)
 "Do You Love Me?" (Martyn P. Casey, Nick Cave) – 4:37
 "Cassiels Song" – 3:34
 "Sail Away" – 4:36
 "Do You Love Me? – Part 2" (Martyn P. Casey, Nick Cave) – 6:12

Personnel
Adapted from the Do You Love Me? liner notes.

Nick Cave and The Bad Seeds
 Blixa Bargeld – guitar
 Martyn P. Casey – bass guitar
 Nick Cave – lead vocals, piano, organ
 Mick Harvey – guitar, organ, marimba
 Conway Savage – piano
 Thomas Wydler – drums

Production and additional personnel
 Polly Borland – photography
 Tony Cohen – production, mixing
 Rowland S. Howard – backing vocals
 Tex Perkins – backing vocals

Charts

Release history

References

External links 
 

1993 songs
1994 singles
Nick Cave songs
Songs written by Nick Cave
Elektra Records singles
Mute Records singles
Song recordings produced by David Briggs (record producer)
Punk blues songs
Songs written by Martyn P. Casey